Sophie Amalie Caroline of Saxe-Hildburghausen (born: 21 July 1732 in Hildburghausen; died: 19 June 1799 in Öhringen), was a princess of Saxe-Hildburghausen and by marriage Princess of Hohenlohe-Neuenstein-Oehringen.

Life 
Amalie was the youngest child and only daughter of the Duke Ernest Frederick II of Saxe-Hildburghausen from his marriage to Caroline Amalie, a daughter of Count Philipp Charles of Erbach-Fürstenau.

She married on 28 January 1749 in Hildburghausen with Prince Louis of Hohenlohe-Neuenstein-Oehringen (23 May 1723 – 27 July 1805). They had one son, Charles Louis Frederick (20 April 1754 – 28 February 1755).

Because they didn't have surviving male issue, after Louis' death his lands fell to Hohenlohe-Ingelfingen.

In 1770 Amalie invited her disgraced brother Eugene -and later his wife when they married in 1778- to live at the court in Öhringen, where they both lived until their deaths (in 1795 and 1790, respectively).

She was buried with her husband in a special resting place of the Collegiate Church in Öhringen. Here, in the southern transept, a marble relief of Caroline and her husband was created in a neo-classicist style by the sculptor Johann Gottfried Schadow on the occasion of the golden wedding of the couple in 1799.

References and sources 
 Beschreibung des Oberamts Oehringen, H. Lindemann, Stuttgart, 1865, p. 111 (Digitized)
 Heinrich Ferdinand Schoeppl: Die Herzoge von Sachsen-Altenburg, Bozen, 1917, reprinted Altenburg, 1992

Footnotes 

Princesses of Saxe-Hildburghausen
1732 births
1799 deaths
German duchesses
18th-century German people
Daughters of monarchs